Amad Ahmad Al Kaddour (born 4 January 1993) is a Syrian professional footballer, who currently plays for Al Salibikhaet in the Kuwaiti Premier League.

Career

Al Shorta
For the 2012–13 season, Ahmad played for Al Shorta for which he scored once in the league against Hutteen SC on 20 February 2013 in which he found the net in the 14th minute as his club won 2–0.

Churchill Brothers
Kaddour made his professional debut for Churchill Brothers in the I-League on 21 September 2013 against Salgaocar at the Duler Stadium; as Churchill Brothers lost the match 1–0. Syrian striker has been released by defending I-League champions after failing to impress in the four games.

Al Wahda
In December 2013 Al Kaddour joined 2013 Syrian Cup winners Al Wahda of the Syrian Premier League. On February 10, 2014 he scored his first goal in the League match against Al-Muhafaza, which his team won 3-1.

Al-Baqa'a
He joined Al-Baqa'a in August, 2014.

International career
Ahmad represented the national team in 2012 AFC U-19 Championship. In the Quarter-finals against Uzbekistan he missed a penalty in the tie-breaker.

Career statistics

References

1993 births
Living people
Syrian footballers
Churchill Brothers FC Goa players
Association football forwards
Sportspeople from Aleppo
Syrian expatriate footballers
Syrian expatriate sportspeople in Jordan
Expatriate footballers in India
Expatriate footballers in Jordan
Syrian Premier League players